U.S. Route 89 (US 89) in the U.S. state of Utah is a north-south United States Highway spanning more than  through the central part of the state, making it the longest road in Utah. Between Provo and Brigham City, US-89 serves as a local road, paralleling (and occasionally concurring with) Interstate 15, but the portions from Arizona north to Provo and Brigham City northeast to Wyoming serve separate corridors. The former provides access to several national parks and Arizona, and the latter connects I-15 with Logan, the state's only Metropolitan Statistical Area not on the Interstate.

When US-89 was established in the state in 1926, the road initially extended north to US-91 in Spanish Fork. Following the extension of the former to the Canada–US border, Interstate 15 was constructed roughly paralleling US-89 to the west and replacing US-91 south of Brigham City. During this process, US-89 was rerouted in southern Utah and northern Arizona, with the old roadway becoming US-89A.

Route description

Arizona border to I-70

US-89 enters Utah from the south inside the Glen Canyon National Recreation Area, about 7 miles (11 km) north of the Glen Canyon Dam, where it crosses the Colorado River near Page, Arizona. After leaving the recreation area and passing the small town of Big Water, the highway curves west through the Grand Staircase–Escalante National Monument. US-89 stays near the monument's southern boundary, crossing the East Clark Bench and The Cockscomb and passing south of the Vermilion Cliffs of the Grand Staircase. At the city of Kanab, US-89 meets the north end of US-89A, an alternate route south into Arizona, and abruptly turns north and begins climbing the staircase. Here the Mount Carmel Scenic Byway begins; one of the Utah Scenic Byways, it stretches north to SR-12 at Bryce Canyon Junction. The Vermilion Cliffs are ascended via the canyon carved by Kanab Creek. Near the White Cliffs, US-89 meets SR-9 at Mt. Carmel Junction, where travelers can turn to reach Zion National Park. The final "step" is the Pink Cliffs, where the highway follows alongside the Virgin River to the highest point on US-89 in southern Utah and the east end of SR-14, a summit at Long Valley Junction (elevation 7450 feet/2300 m).

North from Long Valley Junction, US-89 descends through the valley of the Sevier River, meeting SR-12, a scenic highway that leads to Bryce Canyon National Park, at Bryce Canyon Junction, SR-143 in Panguitch (which leads to Cedar Breaks National Monument), and SR-20 at Bear Valley Junction. As the highway continues north, the valley narrows significantly into the Circleville Canyon before opening out near the town of Circleville. In this part of the valley, the Sevier River is dammed to create the Piute Reservoir, and US-89 meets SR-62 near Kingston. North of Marysvale, the valley again narrows into the Sevier Canyon, which carries the river to its confluence with Clear Creek and US-89 to its overlap with Interstate 70, beginning at Sevier.

I-70 to the Wasatch Front
Although US-89 follows the I-70 freeway from Sevier to Salina, the old alignment can still be driven, and is state-maintained north of Elsinore as SR-258, SR-118 (which overlaps I-70 Business through Richfield), SR-24, and US-50. Both highways stay mainly in the west half of the Sevier River's valley, with the faster I-70/US-89 bypassing the surface road's communities. Just south of Salina, I-70 curves to the east, rising alongside Salina Creek, and US-89 exits into downtown Salina, where it rejoins its pre-freeway alignment. US-50 overlaps US-89 between I-70 and Salina, following I-70 east and a separate alignment northwest from the area; the short Interstate 70 Business also uses this roadway as a business spur from I-70 to the city. North of Salina, US-89 bypasses Redmond (SR-256 follows the former route through the town) and passes through Centerfield to Gunnison, where it meets SR-28 and finally turns away from the Sevier River.

At Gunnison, US-89 turns east before curving northeast into the Sanpete Valley, formed by the San Pitch River, a tributary of the Sevier River. Along US-89 in this valley are several small cities: Manti, Ephraim, Mount Pleasant, and Fairview. Between Ephraim and Mount Pleasant, US-89 meets the south end of SR-132 at Pigeon Hollow Junction. SR-132 was formerly US-189, connecting US-89 with US-91 in Nephi. Beyond Fairview, where the scenic SR-31 turns east, US-89 climbs out of the valley, reaching a summit at Hill Top (elevation 6400 feet/2000 m). Thistle Creek parallels the next leg of the highway, descending through a canyon to the junction with US-6 near the ghost town of Thistle, flooded by a landslide in 1983. Thistle Creek and Soldier Creek, paralleled by US-89 and US-6, merge near this junction to form Spanish Fork, which the overlapped routes follow northwest through Spanish Fork Canyon into the Utah Valley at Moark Junction. US-89 splits to the north from US-6 there, skirts the west edge of Mapleton, and merges with SR-51 - the old Arrowhead Trail (US-91) - south of downtown Springville.

Southern Wasatch Front

From Springville north to Salt Lake City, US-89 parallels—and for a distance overlaps—Interstate 15, following the old Arrowhead Trail, once the main highway from Salt Lake City to Los Angeles, through several downtowns. Numerous state highways connect US-89 to I-15, including SR-77 in Springville, SR-114 in Provo, SR-52 in Orem, SR-180 and SR-145 in American Fork, and SR-73 in Lehi. In Provo, US-89 meets US-189, its only branch, which heads northeast through Provo Canyon to Heber City, connecting to I-80 and bypassing Salt Lake City. North of Lehi, US-89 merges with I-15 (at exit 282), which has been built on or near the old road through a gap in the Traverse Mountains (elevation 4800 feet/1500 m) into the Salt Lake Valley. The routes split in Draper, formerly with a direct interchange north of SR-71, but US-89 traffic must now exit at SR-71 (exit 291), turn east to Factory Outlet Drive, and follow this frontage road to the location of the former split. From here to downtown Salt Lake City, US-89 is marked along State Street, a major north–south street that ends at the Utah State Capitol. After passing through Sandy, Midvale, Murray, Millcreek Township, and South Salt Lake, State Street enters Salt Lake City at the intersection with SR-201 (2100 South).

Until 2007, US-89 followed State Street to North Temple (100 North), two blocks from the capitol, but now it turns at 400 South, following the former alignment of SR-186 and SR-176 west and north on 300 West, and rejoining its pre-2007 route at North Temple. In this area, modern US-89 runs for one block with the UTA TRAX Red Line in its median before crossing the TRAX line in Main Street's median, then passing the Frank E. Moss United States Courthouse, Pioneer Park, the historic Warehouse District at Pierpont Avenue, Japantown, EnergySolutions Arena, the Arena TRAX station, the Triad Center, and West High School. As it leaves downtown, 300 West curves northwesterly and becomes Beck Street, meeting the modern terminus of SR-186 at Victory Road at the back side of Capitol Hill.

Northern Wasatch Front

US-89 leaves Salt Lake City at exit 312 of I-15, where it acts as I-15's frontage roads. Just south of I-15's junction with I-215, US-89 splits to the northeast, passing through Bountiful and Woods Cross. A northerly curve onto 500 West removes the highway from Bountiful's Main Street, and it merges with I-15 at exit 317 to bypass Centerville and Farmington, where the old road (former US-91, but never US-89) is SR-106, through the narrow strip of land that separates Farmington Bay from the Wasatch Mountains. US-89 leaves I-15 at exit 324, where the Legacy Parkway also ends, and proceeds north on a freeway. This portion of US-89 is the only one to include exit numbers based on its mileage, as opposed to the overlapping I-15 or I-70. The freeway ends after US-89 crosses SR-273, the former surface alignment of US-91 in both directions, and heads north as a four-lane road along the Wasatch foothills, to the east of Layton and Hill Air Force Base. This portion is planned to be upgraded to freeway status by 2023.  After crossing I-84 in Uintah, US-89 enters Ogden, which it traverses via Washington Boulevard, rejoining old US-91 (now SR-26) south of downtown. Beyond Ogden, US-89 continues in a general northerly direction along the thin strip between Willard Bay and the Wasatch Mountains to Brigham City, where it finally turns east away from the I-15 corridor.

Wasatch Front to Idaho border
US-89 meets the current alignment of US-91 in the southern outskirts of Brigham City, turning east for an overlap on the city's southeast bypass. (SR-13 and SR-90 are the former alignment through Brigham City.) The two routes head east up Box Elder Canyon in the southern Wellsville Mountains, finally leaving the valley of the Great Salt Lake into a small valley that contains Mantua Reservoir (elevation 5200 feet/1585 m). US-89/US-91 turns north there, bypassing the town of Mantua to the west, and continues to ascend through Dry Canyon to Sardine Summit (elevation 5900 feet/1798 m). Another small valley leads to Wellsville Canyon, where the four-lane roadway again turns east and descends into the Cache Valley. In that valley, US-89/US-91 heads northeast, bypassing Wellsville to the east, into downtown Logan. US-91 continues northerly from Logan into Idaho, but US-89 splits to the east, beginning a long climb of the Bear River Range through Logan Canyon. The Logan Canyon Scenic Byway, a Utah and National Scenic Byway, begins at Logan and follows US-89 up the canyon, past the access road to the Beaver Mountain ski area, to Garden City and on to the state line. Bear Lake Summit (elevation 7800 ft/2377 m), at the top of the range, is the highest point on US-89 in Utah, from which it descends the east slope via horseshoe curves to Garden City on the shore of Bear Lake (elevation 5900 ft/1798 m). The final segment of US-89 to the Idaho state line follows the lake's west shore, its location constrained by the Bear River Range just to the west.

History

When US-89 was created in 1926, it only went as far north as Spanish Fork, where travelers could continue to Salt Lake City via US-91. The highway was extended north to the Canada–US border near Glacier National Park in the mid-1930s, though a dispute between Utah and Idaho on the one side and Wyoming on the other was not settled until 1938. The American Association of State Highway Officials decided in favor of Utah and Idaho, placing US-89 on or near US-91 between Spanish Fork and Logan, where it split northeasterly to Yellowstone National Park. (US-89 only left US-91 twice: between Farmington and Ogden, where it still travels today, and via an all-weather route from Brigham City into the Cache Valley, now SR-38 and SR-30.) Wyoming's preferred routing, which left US-91 at Provo, instead became US-189. Beginning in the 1950s, Interstate 15 was constructed, replacing US-91 for through traffic south of Brigham City, and leading to that route's truncation there in 1974. On the other hand, US-89 follows independent corridors south of Spanish Fork and north of Logan. It has not been truncated and mostly follows US-91's final alignment, except between Farmington and Ogden (where old US-91 is now I-15, SR-126, and SR-26).

The southern part of US-89, running northerly from Kanab, mostly follows a succession of linear valleys. The Denver and Rio Grande Western Railroad opened a branch (later the Marysvale Branch) from its main line at Thistle to Manti in 1890, and extended it (through a subsidiary, the Sevier Railway), to Salina in 1891, Belknap in 1896, and Marysvale in 1900. No rail line ever reached farther south, and so residents of towns such as Junction, Panguitch, Alton, Glendale, and Kanab had to travel north to the railhead at Marysvale. The old county road through Circleville Canyon was poorly constructed, with steep grades and a rough surface. The State Road Commission designated the highway from Nephi east through Salt Creek Canyon and then south through these valleys to Kanab as a state road in or soon after 1910. Initially, the route from the summit at Long Valley Junction to Kanab went through Alton and Johnson Canyon, entering Kanab from the east. A more direct route via Long Valley was considered, serving the communities of Glendale, Orderville, and Mt. Carmel, but this would have required difficult construction over a mesa covered in loose sand to reach Kanab. In summer 1912, the commission added a branch from Long Valley Junction to Mt. Carmel, allowing these communities access to the state road system, along with a connection west from the junction to Cedar City. Several years later, in December 1915, the commission added the Mt. Carmel-Kanab road over the sand hills to the system and began construction of a sand-clay road in 1916. A connection from Pigeon Hollow Junction north to Thistle was also added in 1912, following the rail line through a canyon and providing another route to Salt Lake City.

In 1919, the state legislature redefined the state road system to include only a short list given in the law and any federal aid projects. The route from Kanab north was kept, including both approaches to Kanab and the two roads to Nephi and Thistle. In addition, a short extension from Kanab south to Arizona was added. An amendment in 1923 removed most of the original route through Johnson Canyon, but added a second route to Alton from the west, effectively forming a large triangular loop through that town. (The old route from Alton south to Kanab would be re-added to the state road system in 1933 as SR-136.) In the early 1920s, the State Road Commission assigned numbers to several major state roads; the route from Arizona northerly through Kanab and Richfield to Nephi became . The numbers were officially adopted by the legislature in 1927, with both the main route and the loop through Alton being defined as SR-11; a new  followed the branch to Thistle. The Alton loop was removed from SR-11 in 1941, with the south half remaining in the system as part of SR-136. Despite these designations, the majority of SR-11 and all of SR-32 were instead marked as US-89, with the remainder of SR-11 between Pigeon Hollow Junction and Nephi marked as US-189 from about 1930 until 1938.

State Route 1, which became U.S. Route 91 in 1926, ran north–south through central and northern Utah in the 1920s. State Route 2 left SR-1 at Logan and ran east through Logan Canyon to Garden City; this had been built with federal aid as a forest road in about 1918. The road north from Garden City to Idaho was added to the system in 1921, and became part of State Route 3. In 1927, the legislature added State Route 49, an alternate southern entrance to Ogden that left SR-1 at Farmington and merged with SR-5 (US-30S) at Uintah. (Present SR-60 was numbered as a branch of SR-49 until 1935.) State Route 69, stretching from US-191 (now SR-13) just north of Brigham City north and east to US-91 in Logan, became a state highway in 1931. The 1930s extension of US-89 took it north from Thistle along US-50 (SR-8) to Springville, US-91 (SR-1 and SR-106, later all SR-1) to Farmington, SR-49 to Uintah, US-30S (SR-5) to Ogden, US-91 (SR-1) to Brigham City, SR-69 to Logan, SR-2 to Garden City, and SR-3 to Idaho. US-89 was removed from SR-69 and overlapped with US-91 between Brigham City and Logan in the mid-1950s.

In 1957, one year after construction began on the Glen Canyon Dam, the legislature designated a new State Route 259, heading east and southeast from SR-11 in Kanab to Arizona en route to the dam and adjacent bridge. This replaced about eight miles (13 km) of SR-136 (the original state highway from the 1910s) at its south end, but the remainder was a new roadway, through an area not previously served by improved roads. The route passed the dam was initially designated as an alternate route of US-89, but when completed on 20 February 1959, it instead became US-89's mainline, as it was a better route during all weather, and the old route (SR-11 south of Kanab) became U.S. Route 89 Alternate.

Major numbering changes were made in Utah's state highway system in the 1960s and 1970s, beginning with the construction of Interstate Highways and culminating in the 1977 renumbering, where state route numbers concurrent with other types were dropped entirely. However, most of these changes were not visible to the public, as signs continued to display US-89 and other U.S. Routes and Interstates. The following changes were made to state routes related to US-89:

In particular, SR-11 was cut back to only the roadway south from Kanab, which had become US-89A in 1959.

Major intersections

References

External links

Utah Scenic Byways: Kanab to Mt Carmel and Long Valley Scenic Byway

89
089
 Utah
Transportation in Kane County, Utah
Transportation in Garfield County, Utah
Transportation in Piute County, Utah
Transportation in Sevier County, Utah
Transportation in Sanpete County, Utah
Transportation in Utah County, Utah
Transportation in Salt Lake County, Utah
Transportation in Davis County, Utah
Transportation in Weber County, Utah
Transportation in Box Elder County, Utah
Transportation in Cache County, Utah
Transportation in Rich County, Utah